Attack  is a 2016 Telugu-language political thriller film written, and directed by Ram Gopal Varma and produced by C. Kalyan. It features Manchu Manoj and Surbhi , while Jagapati Babu, Prakash Raj, and Vadde Naveen play supporting roles. The music was composed by Ravi Shankar. The film was released worldwide on 1 April 2016.

Plot
Guru Raj the man of the masses, is a powerful businessman of Charminar Group of Companies who runs his gang as a mafia don. He has three sons Kaali, Gopi, and Radha Krishna "Radha" who are his backbones. Valli loves Radha, tries to drag him away from these issues. Meanwhile, Guru Raj is slaughtered by some unknown gangsters while visiting a temple. The incident makes severe impact on his family as it made clueless about the motive. Here, Kaali seeks vengeance and starts digging the matter. Unfortunately, he too was killed in unusual circumstances. Therefrom, infuriated Radha decide to eliminate the men responsible for his father and brother's death. Finally, he solves the murders and takes avenge.

Cast
 Manchu Manoj as Radha Krishna "Radha"
 Jagapati Babu as Kaali
 Surbhi as Valli
 Prakash Raj as Guru Raj
 Vadde Naveen as Gopi
 Abhimanyu Singh as Sattu
 Poonam Kaur as Sakhi
 Manju Bhargavi as Guru Raj's wife
 Chalapathi Rao as Masthan
 Narsing Yadav as Bhadri

Soundtrack

Music composed by Ravi Shankar. Lyrics written by Sira Sri. Music released on Lahari Music Company.

Production

Filming
The film was officially launched on 20 February 2015 and its regular shoot has started from next day. Some important scenes of the film are being shot in a RTO office in Hyderabad.

Casting
It is second time team up for Jagapathi Babu with Ram Gopal Varma after his blockbuster film Gaayam in 1993 and it is the Manchu Manoj's first time team up with Ram Gopal Varma and second time team up with Jagapati babu after the Current Theega.Vadde Naveen making his comeback in this film with a crucial role. Beeruva fame Surbhi has been roped in this film as the lead actress.

Release
The first motion poster of Attack was released on 30 May 2015 and the theatrical trailer was released on 31 May 2015. The film was released on 1 April 2016.

References

External links
 

2010s Telugu-language films
2010s political thriller films
Films directed by Ram Gopal Varma
Indian films about revenge
Indian neo-noir films
Indian crime thriller films
Indian political thriller films
2016 crime thriller films
Films about organised crime in India
Crime films based on actual events
Thriller films based on actual events